Admete tabulata is a species of sea snail, a marine gastropod mollusk in the family Cancellariidae, the nutmeg snails.

Description
The shell grows to a length of 22 mm.

Distribution
This species occurs in Arctic waters.

References

 Petit R.E. (2009) George Brettingham Sowerby, I, II & III: their conchological publications and molluscan taxa. Zootaxa 2189: 1–218.

External links
 Hemmen J. (2007) Recent Cancellariidae. Annotated and illustrated catalogue of Recent Cancellariidae. Privately published, Wiesbaden. 428 pp. [With amendments and corrections taken from Petit R.E. (2012) A critique of, and errata for, Recent Cancellariidae by Jens Hemmen, 2007. Conchologia Ingrata 9: 1–8

Cancellariidae
Gastropods described in 1875